Alexander Stewart, Duke of Ross (30 April 1514 – 18 December 1515) was the fourth and last son of King James IV of Scotland and his queen Margaret Tudor.

He was born after his father was killed at the Battle of Flodden, during the reign of his infant brother King James V of Scotland. His nurse was Katherine Fyn. 

He died in infancy, but during his short life he was heir presumptive to the throne of the Kingdom of Scotland.

Ancestry

References 

Bingham, Caroline James V King of Scots

Courtesy dukes
Alexander
Scottish princes
Alexander
People from Stirling
1514 births
1515 deaths
Scottish people of Danish descent
Dukes of Ross
Children of James IV of Scotland
Royalty and nobility who died as children
Sons of kings
Non-inheriting heirs presumptive